Shelby Ringdahl (born April 3, 1992) is an American beauty pageant titleholder from Columbia, Missouri who was named Miss Missouri 2013. She competed for the Miss America 2014 crown and made the semi-finals.

Biography
Ringdahl is a graduate of Rock Bridge High School and is a senior at Texas Christian University, majoring in musical theatre. At Texas Christian, Shelby was involved in Kappa Alpha Theta sorority. She won the title of Miss Missouri on June 8, 2013, when she received her crown from outgoing titleholder Tippe Emmott. Ringdahl's platform is “Finding Safety: Helping Abused Children Discover Love Through CASA” and she said she hoped to become an advocate for abused children during her year as Miss Missouri. Her competition talent was a vocal rendition of “Defying Gravity.”

References

External links

 
 

Miss America 2014 delegates
1992 births
Living people
People from Columbia, Missouri
Texas Christian University alumni
American beauty pageant winners